Lawrence Albert McIntyre (born July 13, 1949) is a Canadian former ice hockey defenceman. He played 41 games in the National Hockey League for the Toronto Maple Leafs between 1970 and 1973. The rest of his career, which lasted from 1969 to 1976, was mainly spent in the Central Hockey League.

Career statistics

Regular season and playoffs

External links
 

1949 births
Living people
Buffalo Bisons (AHL) players
Canadian ice hockey defencemen
Ice hockey people from Saskatchewan
Moose Jaw Canucks players
Seattle Totems (CHL) players
Seattle Totems (WHL) players
Sportspeople from Moose Jaw
Toronto Maple Leafs draft picks
Toronto Maple Leafs players
Tulsa Oilers (1964–1984) players